Radiostars is a 2012 French comedy film co-written and directed by Romain Levy.

Plot 
Having failed to break into show business in New York as a comedian, Ben returned to Paris with his unaccomplished dream. He meets Alex, the star anchor of Blast FM flagship radio show, the Breakfast Club. Soon, Ben joined the team formed by Alex, Cyril and Arnold, and together they travel the roads of France to meet and win over the listeners of their radio show once again.

Cast 

 Manu Payet as Alex
 Clovis Cornillac as Arnold
 Douglas Attal as Ben
 Pascal Demolon as Cyril
 Benjamin Lavernhe as Smiters
 Côme Levin as Jérémy
 Zita Hanrot as Jennifer
 Sam Karmann as J.R. Jablonski
 Jacky Ido as Léonard de Vitry
 Ana Girardot as Sabrina
 Laurent Bateau as Frédérico
 Alice Belaïdi as Nassima
 Juliette Plumecocq-Mech as Daniel(le)
 Anthony Sonigo as Bastien
 Mona Walravens as Sonia
 Marie Lenoir as Marie
 Pom Klementieff as The Pizza Girl

References

External links 
 

2012 films
2010s comedy road movies
2010s French-language films
French comedy road movies
Films about radio people
Films scored by Robin Coudert
2012 directorial debut films
2012 comedy films
2010s French films